M. Subramanian Namboodiri (1 March 1929 – 1 February 2019), commonly known by his pen name Thuppettan, was a Malayalam-language playwright from Kerala, India. Hailing from Panjal, a village in Thrissur district of Kerala, Thuppettan had been a drawing teacher at a local school. His father Ittiravi Namboodiri was a Vedic scholar who tried to reform the conservative practices of the Namboodiri community.

Some of the most famous works of Thuppettan include Thanathu Lavanam, Marumarunnu, Vettakkarappayal, Swaapaharanam Athava Ellarum Argentinayilekku, Bhadrayanam, Kalavastha, Mohanasundarapaalam, Double Act and Chakka. He won the Kerala Sahitya Akademi Award in 2003 for Vannanthye Kaanam, a collection of 10 short and hilarious plays.

References

1929 births
2019 deaths
People from Thrissur district
Dramatists and playwrights from Kerala
Malayalam-language writers
Malayalam-language dramatists and playwrights
Indian male dramatists and playwrights
20th-century Indian dramatists and playwrights
20th-century Indian male writers